Steve Turre (né Stephen Johnson Turre; born 12 September 1948 Omaha, Nebraska) is an American jazz trombonist, a pioneering musical seashell virtuoso, a composer, arranger, and educator at the collegiate-conservatory level who, for  years, has been active in jazz, rock, and Latin jazz – in live venues, recording studios, television, and cinema production. As a studio musician, Turre is among the most prolific living jazz trombonist in the world. As a member of a television orchestra, this is Turre's  year as trombonist with the Saturday Night Live Band.

Selected discography

As leader

As sideman

References

External links

 Official site

Jazz discographies
Discographies of American artists